Iftikhar al-Dawla was the Fatimid governor of Jerusalem during the siege of 1099. On 15 July, he surrendered Jerusalem to Raymond of Saint-Gilles in the Tower of David and was escorted out of the city with his bodyguard.

Little is known about Iftikhar al-Dawla, although he is mentioned as governor of Ascalon following the fall of Jerusalem, which suggests he was Fatimid governor of the whole of Palestine. The Syrian chronicler Bar-Hebraeus refers to him as an Egyptian man. Usamah ibn Munqidh's autobiography mentions an emir of the local castles of Abu Qubays, Qadmus and al-Kaf called Iftikhar al-Dawla whose sister was married to Usamah's uncle, the ruler of Shayzar.

Defence of Jerusalem
Iftikhar al-Dawla had a strong garrison of Arab and Sudanese troops. Hearing of the advance of the Franks he poisoned the wells outside Jerusalem; moved livestock from the pastures inside the city walls and sent urgently to Egypt for reinforcements. He then ordered all Christians, then the majority of the population, to evacuate the city, but allowed Jews to remain within. Although the garrison was well-supplied it was insufficient to man all the walls and was overwhelmed after a siege lasting six weeks.

Notes

Bibliography
Geary, Patrick J. (2003). Readings in Medieval History. Broadview Press. 
Nicolle, David (2003). The First Crusade 1096–1099: Conquest of the Holy Land. Osprey. 
Runciman, Steven (1992). The First Crusade. Cambridge University Press. 

Generals of the Fatimid Caliphate
11th century in Jerusalem
11th-century people from the Fatimid Caliphate
12th-century people from the Fatimid Caliphate
Arab generals
Shia Muslims
Muslims of the First Crusade
11th-century Arabs
12th-century Arabs